Playahitty was an Italian Eurodance group, best known for the 1994 summer hit "The Summer Is Magic", and also for other popular club tracks, such as "1-2-3! (Train with Me)". Lipsync was performed on stage and in the videos by models called Marion, Sandra, Feline and Gabrielle.

Musical career
Their main hit, a 1994 song titled "The Summer Is Magic", featured the voice of Giovanna Bersola, best known by her stage name Jenny B, one of the most important voices of the Italo dance/Eurodance genre, who also did the real vocals for the debut hit of Corona, "The Rhythm of the Night" (all other songs on the first and second albums by Corona were sung by Sandra Chambers a.k.a. Sandy). This led to the mistaken belief that "The Summer Is Magic" was another hit song by Corona.

The song was written by Emanuele Asti and Stefano Carrara, produced by Asti and licensed worldwide by Disco Inn/Conte Max Music.

Discography

Singles

References

Italian Eurodance groups
Italian dance music groups